Małgorzata Dorota Kożuchowska (born April 27, 1971) is a Polish actress and TV presenter. She is best known as Hanna Mostowiak in the very popular Polish television series, M jak miłość, Ewa Szańska in the movies Kiler and Kiler-ów 2-óch, and Natalia Boska in Rodzinka.pl.

She was awarded the Medal for Merit to Culture – Gloria Artis and the Order of Polonia Restituta.

Life and career 
She is the eldest daughter of Leszek Kożuchowski, a doctor of pedagogical sciences, and Jadwiga Kozuchowska, a teacher. She has two sisters, Maja and Hanna. She grew up in Toruń.

In 1994, she graduated from the Aleksander Zelwerowicz National Academy of Dramatic Art in Warsaw. After earning her diploma, she joined the ensemble of Warsaw's Dramatic Theater, with which she was associated until 2005. Then she was an actress at the National Theater until 2014. She also worked with Warsaw theaters: Na Woli, Komedia and IMKA, in addition to the National Cultural Center in Warsaw, the Polish Theater in Bielsko-Biała, the Polish Radio Theater and the Polish Television Theater.

She gained popularity for her film and television roles in productions such as Kiler (1997), Kiler-ów 2-óch (1999), M jak miłość (2000-2011), Zróbmy sobie wnuka (2003), Tylko miłość (2007-2009), Rodzinka.pl (2011-2020), Prawo Agaty (2012-2015) and Druga szansa (2016-2018).

She is involved in dubbing; she provided the voice of Gloria in Madagascar (2005), Madagascar 2 (2008) and Madagascar 3 (2012), and the White Queen in Alice in Wonderland (2010) and Alice Through the Looking Glass (2016).

She hosted the TVP1 program My, Wy, Oni.

She was an ambassador for cosmetic brands Kolastyna and Avon, and appeared in advertising campaigns for the Aviva insurance group, the Bonarka City Center shopping center and the Tous jewelry company.

In 2006, she released her debut studio album W futrze, which she recorded with the band Futro. The album was a supplement to Elle magazine and was released under the auspices of Radio PiN.

Since October 2007, she has been an ambassador, and since June 2010 also a member of the Program Council of the Mam Marzenie Foundation.

In 2011, she received the St. Brother Albert Medal for her support of people with disabilities.

Since November 2012, she has published in the weekly Sieci.

From 2018 to 2020, she was vice president of the Union of Polish Stage Artists.

Personal life
She is married to Bartłomiej Wróblewski. The wedding took place in 2008 at the Holy Cross Church in Warsaw. The couple was married by Father Piotr Pawlukiewicz. They have a son, Jan Franciszek (born October 10, 2014). She is a practicing Catholic.

Filmography
1994: Ptaszka as Maria
1994: Oczy niebieskie as Harcerka
1994-1995: Fitness Club as Maryjka
1995: Młode wilki as Marzanna
1996: Sukces... as Kochanka Kaweckiego
1996: Pasaż (Passage) as Betty
1997: Pierwsza miłość as Ela
1997: Zaklęta as Ola
1997: Kiler as Ewa Szańska
1997: Rodziców nie ma w domu as Kosa
1997: Sława i chwała as women
1997: Złotopolscy as Jagoda (1998)
1998: Matki, żony i kochanki (series II) as Edyta
1999: Uciekając przed
1999-2005: Na dobre i na złe as Jolanta Majewska (1999)
1999: Lot 001 as Agata
1999: Kiler-ów 2-óch as Ewa Szańska
2000-2011: M jak miłość as Hanna Mostowiak
2000-2001: Przeprowadzki as Lilianna Hirsz
2000: Co nie jest snem (TV play) as Eunice
2001: Wtorek as Małgosia
2002: Krzyżacy 2 as Danusia
2003: Zróbmy sobie wnuka as Zosia Koselówna
2003: Superprodukcja
2003: Sloow as Super Girl
2004: Kilka godzin z Claire as Claire
2005: M jak miłość, czyli poznajmy się as herself
2005: Komornik as Anna
2006: Living & Dying
2007: Dlaczego nie! as Renata
2007: Hania as Kasia
2011-2020: Rodzinka.pl series as Natalia Boska
2012-2013: Prawo Agaty series as Maria Okońska
2016-2018: Druga szansa series as Monika Borecka
2018: The Plagues of Breslau as Helena Rus
2019: The Motive series as Luiza Porębska

Polish dubbing

1993: Kalifornia, as Adele Corners
1994: Molly, as Daniela
2001: Monsters, Inc., as Celinka
2001: Mewtwo's return!, as Domino 009
2001: Lady and the Tramp II: Scamp's Adventure, as Lili
2001–2003: Braceface, as Sharon Spitz
2003: Old School, as Heidi
2004: Pinocchio 3000 as Pinokio
2004: Around the World in 80 Days, as Monique
2005: Valiant, as Charllote De Gaulle
2005: Madagascar, as Gloria
2006: Franklin and the Turtle Lake Treasure – sings
2006: Everyone's Hero, as Yankee Irving
2008: Madagascar 2, as Gloria
2010: Alice in Wonderland, as White Queen
2010: Belka i Strelka. Zvezdnye sobaki, as Belka
2010: Merry Madagascar, as Gloria
2012: Madagascar 3, as Gloria
2013: Kumba, as Mama W

Theater
 Dramatyczny Theatre in Warsaw
 1994: Człowiek z La Manchy
 1994: Szósty stopień oddalenia, as Tess
 1995: Przygody Tomka Sawyera, as Ciocia
 1995: Magia grzechu, as Łakomstwo
 1995: Szkarłatna wyspa
 1996: Ildefonsjada
 1996: Jak wam się podoba as Febe and Dworzanin
 1997: Elektra Sofoklesa
 1997: Wiśniowy sad as Duniasza
 1997: Poskromienie złośnicy as Bianka
 1998: Adam Mickiewicz śmieszy tumani przestrasza 
 1998: Niezidentyfikowane szczątki, as Candy
 1999: Opera żebracza Vaclava Havla, as Polly
 2001: Alicja w krainie czarów, as Królowa
 2003: Obsługiwałem angielskiego... as Blanche
 2005: Opowieść o zwyczajnym szaleństwie, as Jana

 Theatre Comedy in Warsaw
 2006: One as Ryba

 The National Theatre
 2004: Błądzenie po peryferiach as Albertynki, Alicja, Rita
 2005: Kosmos as Lena
 since 2007: Miłość na Krymie as Tatiana Jakowlewna Borodina
 since 2009: Umowa, czyli łajdak ukarany, as Hrabina
 since 2013: Cat on a hot tin roof, as Margaret

Awards
 2004: Telekamera award 2004 Best Actress.
 2004: Gold duck Best Actress
 2005: Telekamera award 2005 Best Actress.
 2005: Silver butterfly - for a healthy lifestyle popularization
 2007: Woman Of The Year "Glamour" as Actress
 2008: Super Jantar
 2013: Viva! Najpiękniejsi the most beautiful Pole
 2013: Woman of decade "Glamour"
 2013: Crystal Boar - for a creative cooperation between actor and director

References

1971 births
Actors from Wrocław
Living people
People from Toruń
Polish film actresses
Polish television actresses
Polish Roman Catholics
Aleksander Zelwerowicz National Academy of Dramatic Art in Warsaw alumni